Anarkali Marikar is an Indian actress who appears predominantly in Malayalam films. She made her debut in 2016 in the film Aanandam.

Early life
Anarkali was born to Nias Marikar and Lali P. M. Her father is a photographer and mother is an actress. She has an elder sister named Lakshmi Marikar, who was a former child actor in the Malayalam film No. 1 Snehatheeram Bangalore North. Anarkali completed her degree in Mass communication from Mar Ivanios College in Thiruvananthapuram. She was offered the role in her debut film Aanandam through its cinematographer Anend C. Chandran, a friend to her sister.

Career
Anarkali made her film debut in 2016 with the teenage romantic-comedy Aanandam, in a supporting role. Her second film Vimaanam (2017) featured Prithviraj Sukumaran in the lead role, and was directed by debutante Pradeep Nair. After that, she was cast in a leading role in Amala, directed by debutante Nishad Ebrahim.

In 2018, she played Devika opposite Asif Ali in Mandharam. In 2019, she appeared in debutante director Manu Ashokan's Uyare, along with Parvathy Thiruvothu, Tovino Thomas and Asif Ali. Manu, who had previously worked with Anarkali in Vimaanam as an associate director, cast her in the movie seeing her performance. Her role as Sariya D'Costa, a friend of protagonist Pallavi (Parvathy), was critically acclaimed. She has also done a guest role in Marconi Mathai directed by debutante Sanil Kalathil. Starring Jayaram and Vijay Sethupathi.

Filmography

All films are in Malayalam language unless otherwise noted.

References

External links

Actresses from Kochi
Indian film actresses
Year of birth missing (living people)
Living people
Actresses in Malayalam cinema
21st-century Indian actresses